Turbo C is a discontinued integrated development environment (IDE) and compiler for the C programming language from Borland. First introduced in 1987, it was noted for its integrated development environment, small size, fast compile speed, comprehensive manuals and low price.

In May 1990, Borland replaced Turbo C with Turbo C++. In 2006, Borland reintroduced the Turbo moniker.

Early history
In the early 1980s, Borland enjoyed considerable success with their Turbo Pascal product and it became a popular choice when developing applications for the PC. Borland followed up that success by releasing Turbo Basic, Turbo Prolog, and in 1987, Turbo C. Turbo C has similar properties to Turbo Pascal: an integrated development environment, a fast compiler (though not near the speed of Turbo Pascal), a good editor, and a competitive price.

While Turbo Pascal was successful with hobbyists and schools as well as professional programmers, Turbo C competed with other professional programming tools, such as Microsoft C, Lattice C, and Watcom C.

Version history
Version 1.0 (May 13, 1987) offered the first integrated development environment for C on IBM PCs. Like many Borland products of the time, the software was bought from another company (in this case Wizard C by Bob Jervis), and branded with the "Turbo" name. It allowed inline assembly with full access to C symbolic names and structures, supported all memory models, and offered optimizations for speed, size, constant folding, and jump elimination.

Version 1.5 (January 1988) was an incremental improvement over version 1.0. It included more sample programs, improved manuals and bug fixes. It was shipped on five 360 KB diskettes of uncompressed files, and came with sample C programs, including a stripped down spreadsheet called mcalc. This version introduced the <conio.h> header file (which provided fast, PC-specific console I/O routines).

Version 2.0 (late 1988) featured the first "blue screen" version, which would be typical of all future Borland releases for MS-DOS. It was also available bundled with Turbo Assembler and Turbo Debugger. Turbo C 2.0 was also released (in Germany only) for the Atari ST; the program was not maintained by Borland, but sold and renamed PureC. This version introduced the <graphics.h> header file, which provided the Borland Graphics Interface already included in Turbo Pascal. 

With the release of Turbo C++ 1.0 (in 1990), the two products were folded into one and the name "Turbo C" was discontinued. The C++ compiler was developed under contract by a company in San Diego, and was one of the first "true" compilers for C++ (until then, it was common to use pre-compilers that generated C code, ref. Cfront).

Freeware release 
In 2006, Borland's successor, Embarcadero Technologies, re-released Turbo C and the MS-DOS versions of the Turbo C++ compilers as freeware.

Reception
BYTE in 1989 listed Turbo C and Turbo Pascal as among the "Distinction" winners of the BYTE Awards. Citing their user interface and continued emphasis on speed, the magazine stated that "for rapid prototyping there's not much better".

See also
 Turbo Assembler
 Turbo Debugger

References

External links
 borland.com - Borland Developer Network Museum
 codegear.com - Turbo C++ version 1.01 
 borland.com - Turbo C 2.01 Free download from EDN
 computermuseum-muenchen.de - Computer Museum in Munich with a large collection of software, including Turbo C 1.0 ff

1987 software
Borland software
C (programming language) compilers
DOS software